Doomsday Machine, also known as Escape from Planet Earth (video title), is an American science fiction film filmed in 1967 but completed without the original cast or sets in 1972.

Plot

A spy (Essie Lin Chia) discovers that the Chinese government has created a doomsday device (the "key" to which, "only Chairman Mao has") capable of destroying the Earth and it will be activated in 72 hours. Soon after, Astra – a two-year return mission to Venus by the United States Space Program – has its time of launch speeded up and half of the male flight crew are replaced by women shortly before take-off, including one Russian. Shortly before blastoff military alerts are put into effect.

After leaving Earth, the seven crew members of Astra deduce that they have been put together to restart the human race should the Chinese activate their device. Shortly after this, the device goes off and Earth is destroyed.

As Astra continues to Venus, the crew realizes that a safe landing on Venus is impossible unless the crew is reduced to three. One of the crew members tries to rape another, at which point she accidentally gets them both blown out of an airlock.

Two more crew-members—Danny and Major Bronski—are lost as they head out to repair a fault with the spaceship. However, they notice another spacecraft nearby and jump to it. The second craft proves to be a lost Soviet ship that disappeared piloted by a close friend of the Russian crew member.  Though its pilot is dead, Danny and Bronski successfully power up the Soviet ship. Before the two ships can rendezvous, contact with Astra is lost.

A disembodied voice cuts in, claiming to be the collective consciousness of the Venusian population. The voice informs the survivors (whom the Venusians refer to as the "Last of Man") in the Russian ship that Astra no longer exists (presumably destroyed somehow by the telepathic Venusians), and that no humans (due to their "self-destructive" potential) will be allowed to reach Venus. It gives a cryptic message regarding the prospect of starting new life in a "very strange and very great" place, somewhere far "beyond the rim of the universe," before the ship suddenly blasts off, apparently by the power of the Venusians, and the movie abruptly concludes.

Cast
 Bobby Van as Danny
 Ruta Lee as Dr. Marion Turner
 Mala Powers as Maj. Georgianna Bronski
 James Craig as Dr. Haines
 Grant Williams as Maj. Kurt Mason
 Henry Wilcoxon as Dr. Christopher Perry
 Essie Lin Chia as Girl Spy
 Casey Kasem as Mission Control Officer
 Lorri Scott as Lt. Katie Carlson
 Denny Miller as Col. Don Price
 Mike Farrell as 1st Reporter

Production
Production of Doomsday Machine began in 1967 under Herbert J. Leder's direction under the titles Armageddon 1975 and Doomsday Plus Seven. Production stopped on the film before it was completed (presumably due to funding problems), but the rights to the film were eventually purchased and the film was completed in 1972, albeit without the original cast members, costumes or sets.

Sloppy production standards have made the film a favorite for buffs of bad cinema.  The film relies extensively on stock footage, including real (but badly degraded) NASA rocket footage, special effects shots from David L. Hewitt's The Wizard of Mars (1965; Hewitt receives a special effects credit for Doomsday Machine), Gorath (1962) and other disparate sources, leading to numerous, glaring continuity errors. Among such persistent mistakes is the external appearance of the Astra, which inexplicably changes throughout the film. The painfully protracted last segment of the movie – with an American and Russian astronaut boarding a derelict Soviet spacecraft – was obviously shot after the unfinished principal photography without the participation of the original actors. After this point, the characters stay in their spacesuits, which look different from those shown in the immediately preceding scenes, and their helmets are now opaque, concealing the doubles' faces. The characters speak, but in completely different voices than before, the Russian no longer even having an accent. The slow, repetitive pacing of this sequence is also markedly different from the rest of the film and suggests an effort to pad the film's running time out in order to reach a desired length.

In popular culture
The film was featured on Elvira's Movie Macabre.
The film was the second film riffed in the Cinematic Titanic series.
This film was reviewed by the Nostalgia Critic on Best of TGWTG Volume 3.
The film was reviewed by Bill Gibron of PopMatters.

References

External links
 
 
 http://www.rottentomatoes.com/m/doomsday-machine/

1972 films
American science fiction films
1970s science fiction films
1960s science fiction films
Films about astronauts
Films directed by Herbert J. Leder
Films set in 1975
Venus in film
1960s unfinished films
1970s English-language films
1960s English-language films
1960s American films
1970s American films